Vertigo extima is a species of minute air-breathing land snail, a terrestrial pulmonate gastropod mollusc or micromollusc in the family Vertiginidae, the whorl snails.

Description
The length of the shell attains 3 mm, its diameter 1¾ mm.

Distribution

Vertigo extima is usually found in northern Scandinavia, northern Siberia and in western Alaska.

References

 Bank, R. A.; Neubert, E. (2017). Checklist of the land and freshwater Gastropoda of Europe. Last update: July 16th, 2017
 Sysoev, A. V. & Schileyko, A. A. (2009). Land snails and slugs of Russia and adjacent countries. Sofia/Moskva (Pensoft). 312 pp., 142 plates

External links
 Westerlund, C. A. (1876). Neue Binnenmollusken aus Sibirien. Nachrichtsblatt der Deutschen Malakozoologischen Gesellschaft. 8 (8/9): 97-104, Frankfurt am Main 

extima
Gastropods described in 1877